Karl Weissenberg (11 June 1893, Vienna – 6 April 1976, The Hague) was an Austrian physicist, notable for his contributions to rheology and crystallography.

Biography
The Weissenberg effect was named after him, as was the Weissenberg number. He invented a Goniometer to study X-ray diffraction of crystals for which he received the Duddell Medal of the Institute of Physics in 1946, The European Society of Rheology offers a Weissenberg award in his honour. and the Weissenberg rheogoniometer, a type of rheometer.

He was born on 11 June 1893 in Vienna, Austria and died in 1976 in the Netherlands. He studied at the Universities of Vienna, Berlin and Jena with Mathematics as his main subject.  He published on the theories of Symmetry groups and Tensor and Matrix algebra, then applied mathematics and experimentation to crystallography, rheology and medical science.

References

Further reading
 Publications of Karl Weissenberg (K.W.) and Collaborators
 Churchill Archives Centre, The Papers of Karl Weissenberg (with brief biography)

1893 births
1976 deaths
Austrian physicists
Austrian mathematicians
Rheologists
Crystallographers
Fluid mechanics
Fluid dynamicists
Scientists from Vienna
Austro-Hungarian mathematicians